Haustellum is a genus of medium-sized sea snails, marine gastropod mollusks in the family Muricidae, the murex snails or rock snails. Like many other genera within the Muricidae, the genus has been redefined several times.

Ponder & Vokes (1988) and Vokes (1990) included American and Indo-Pacific species in Haustellum, which differs from Murex sensu stricto by lacking a labral spine.

Petuch (1994) introduced Vokesimurex for the American long-canalled Haustellum sensu Vokes (1990), such as Murex messorius Sowerby, 1841.

Houart (1999) transferred 14 Indo-Pacific species and three subspecies of Haustellum in the genus Vokesimurex.

As currently defined, Haustellum is represented by eight to nine species. Members of Haustellum generally differ from those of Vokesimurex in having a globose and low-spired shape, a more rounded aperture, a smooth columella, a less deep anal notch, and no cord spine.

Species
Species within the genus Haustellum include:

 Haustellum barbieri Houart, 1993
 Haustellum bengalense Bozzetti, 2016 
 Haustellum bondarevi Houart, 1999
 Haustellum damarcoi Briano & Damarco, 2011
 Haustellum fallax (E. A. Smith, 1901)
 Haustellum franchii Bozzetti, 1993
 Haustellum haustellum (Linnaeus, 1758)
 Haustellum kurodai Shikama, 1964
 Haustellum langleitae Houart, 1993
 Haustellum longicaudum (F. C. Baker, 1891)
 Haustellum lorenzi Houart, 2013
 Haustellum tweedianum (Macpherson, 1962):
 Haustellum vicdani Kosuge, 1980
 Haustellum wilsoni D'Attilio & Old, 1971

Species brought into synonymy
 Haustellum bellegladeensis (E. H. Vokes, 1963) : synonym of Vokesimurex bellegladeensis (E. H. Vokes, 1963)
 Haustellum bengalensis Bozzetti, 2016 : synonym of Haustellum bengalense Bozzetti, 2016 (wrong gender agreement of specific epithet)
 Haustellum bobyini (Kosuge, 1983): synonym of  Vokesimurex bobyini (Kosuge, 1983)
 Haustellum brandaris (Linnaeus, 1758) is a synonym for Bolinus brandaris (Linnaeus, 1758)
 Haustellum clavatum Schumacher, 1817: synonym of Bolinus brandaris (Linnaeus, 1758)
 Haustellum danilai Houart, 1992: synonym of Vokesimurex danilai (Houart, 1992)
 Haustellum dentifer (Watson, 1883): synonym of Vokesimurex dentifer dentifer (Watson, 1883)
 Haustellum dolichourus Ponder & Vokes, 1988: synonym of Vokesimurex dolichourus (Ponder & Vokes, 1988)
 Haustellum elenense (Dall, 1909): synonym of Vokesimurex elenensis (Dall, 1909)
 Haustellum gallinago (G.B. Sowerby III, 1903): synonym of Vokesimurex gallinago (G.B. Sowerby III, 1903)
 Haustellum hirasei (Hirase, 1915): synonym of Vokesimurex hirasei (Hirase, 1915)
 Haustellum kiiensis (Kira, 1959): synonym of Vokesimurex kiiensis (Kira, 1959)
 Haustellum laeve Schumacher, 1817: synonym of Haustellum haustellum (Linnaeus, 1758)
 Haustellum malabaricum (E. A. Smith, 1894): synonym of Vokesimurex malabaricus (E. A. Smith, 1894)
 Haustellum mindanaoensis (G.B. Sowerby II, 1841): synonym of Vokesimurex mindanaoensis (G.B. Sowerby II, 1841)
 Haustellum multiplicatus (Sowerby, 1895): synonym of Vokesimurex multiplicatus (Sowerby, 1895)
 Haustellum nobile Schumacher, 1817: synonym of Murex pecten pecten Lightfoot, 1786
 Haustellum purdyae (Radwin & D'Attilio, 1976): synonym of Vokesimurex purdyae (Radwin & D'Attilio, 1976)
 Haustellum rectirostris (Sowerby, 1841): synonym of Vokesimurex rectirostris (Sowerby, 1841)
 Haustellum sobrinus (A. Adams, 1863): synonym of Vokesimurex sobrinus (A. Adams, 1863)

Paleontology
There is no record of extinct species in the geological register. The oldest member is the type species Haustellum haustellum from the Indo-Pacific province. It is recorded from the Miocene of Borneo (Beets, 1941), the Pliocene of Java, Indonesia and the Plio-Pleistocene of the Malaysian Archipelago.

References

 Schumacher C.F. (1817). Essai d'un nouveau système des habitations des vers testacés. Schultz, Copenghagen pp. [IV] + 288 + 22 pl.
 Beets, C. (1941). Eine jungmiocäne Mollusken Fauna von der Halbinsel Mangkalihat, Ost Borneo. Verhandelingen Geologisch-Mijnbouwkunig Genootshap Nederland en Kolonien. Geologisch Serie 13 (1): 1-218.
 Houart, R. (1999). Review of the Indo-Pacific species of Haustellum Schumacher, 1817 and comments on Vokesimurex Petuch, 1994 (Gastropoda: Muricidae) with the description of H. bondarevi n. sp. Apex 14 (3-8): 81-107.
 Merle, D., Garrigues, B. & Pointier, J.-P. (2011). Fossil and Recent Muricidae of the World, Part Muricinae. 648 pp., 182 colour plates, Hackenheim. .
 Petuch, E. J. (1994). Atlas of Florida fossil shells. 394 pp. Chicago.
 Ponder, W. F. & Vokes, E. H. (1988). A revision of the Indo-West Pacific fossil and recent Species of Murex s.s. and Haustellum (Mollusca: Gastropoda: Muricidae). Records of the Australian Museum, Suppl. 8: 1-160.
 Vokes, E. H. (1990): Cenozoic Muricidae of the Western Atlantic region, Part VIII - Murex s.s., Haustellum, Chicoreus, Hexaplex; additions and corrections. Tulane Studies in Geology and Paleontology 23 (1-3): 1-96.
 Houart R. (2014). Living Muricidae of the world. Muricinae. Murex, Promurex, Haustellum, Bolinus, Vokesimurex and Siratus.'' Harxheim: ConchBooks. 197 pp.

 
Muricinae